Xanthovirga is a genus from the family of Flammeovirgaceae with one known species (Xanthovirga aplysinae). Xanthovirga aplysinae has been isolated from the sponge Aplysina fistularis from the coast of San Salvador.

References 

Cytophagia
Bacteria genera
Monotypic bacteria genera
Bacteria described in 2020